Jürgen Wattenberg (28 December 1900 – 27 September 1995) was a German naval officer and U-boat commander during the Second World War.

Wattenberg had an eventful war, serving initially aboard the pocket battleship Admiral Graf Spee during the Battle of the River Plate and up until her scuttling off Montevideo. He was interned in Uruguay but escaped and made his way back to Germany where he joined the U-boat service. He achieved several successes before his U-boat was attacked and sunk by British warships.

Taken prisoner once more, Wattenberg was imprisoned in the United States, where he contrived to escape again, spending over a month at large. He was released after the end of the war and settled in Germany, where he died in 1995, aged 94.

Early life
Wattenberg was born in Lübeck on 28 December 1900. He joined the German Navy, attaining the rank of Fähnrich zur See on 1 April 1923. He was then promoted to Leutnant zur See and Oberleutnant zur See on 1 October 1925 and 1 July 1927 respectively. He was promoted to Kapitänleutnant on 1 October 1938 and by the outbreak of war was serving aboard the pocket battleship Admiral Graf Spee. The Graf Spee was scuttled off Montevideo, Uruguay, in December 1939 by her commanding officer, Kapitän zur See Hans Langsdorff. Wattenberg was interned with the rest of her crew but he escaped and made his way back to Germany, where he arrived in May 1940.

Wattenberg was by this time 41 years old, making him one of the oldest U-boat commanders to undertake a combat patrol.

Command of U-162
Wattenberg was particularly successful in his time as commander of U-162. On his first patrol, from 7 February to 18 March 1942, he ranged through the North Sea and into the Atlantic Ocean, his boat sank a single vessel, the 4,365 ton British White Crest on 24 February. His second patrol lasted from 7 April until 8 June 1942, during which time U-162 preyed on shipping in the Caribbean and off the South American coast. By the time of his return to Lorient he had spent 63 days at sea and sank a further nine ships, a total tonnage of 47,181 GRT. His third and last patrol began with his departure from Lorient on 7 July 1942 and covered the same area as his second. He sank four ships off the coast of South America during August, a total of 30,481 GRT; his last victim being the American Star of Oregon on 30 August.

Two of the crew were killed; Wattenberg and 48 other survivors were rescued and became prisoners of war.

Captivity and later life

Wattenberg was imprisoned in several camps in the United States, starting at Fort Hunt, where he arrived in September 1942. He was then moved to Crossville on 16 October 1942, and again to Camp Papago Park on 27 January 1944. A large break-out occurred on the night of 23–24 December 1944, with Wattenberg being one of the 25 prisoners to escape. Most were recaptured or surrendered fairly quickly; Wattenberg managed to remain at large until 28 January, the last of the escapees to be recaptured. He had been promoted to Kapitän zur See on 1 April 1943, during his time spent imprisoned. With the end of the war Wattenberg was transferred first to Camp Shanks in 1946, then to a compound near Münster before being released.

In later life he became manager of the Lübeck branch of the Bavaria – St. Pauli Brewery. Jürgen Wattenberg died on 27 September 1995, aged 94.

References

Bibliography

External links

1900 births
1995 deaths
U-boat commanders (Kriegsmarine)
Reichsmarine personnel
German prisoners of war in World War II held by the United States
Military personnel from Lübeck
Escapees from United States military detention